The 2016 Brentwood Borough Council election took place on 5 May 2016 to elect members of Brentwood Borough Council in England. This was on the same day as other local elections.

Ward Results

Brentwood North

Brentwood South

Brentwood West

Brizes and Doddinghurst

Hutton Central

Hutton South

Hutton North

Ingatestone, Fryerning and Mountnessing

Pilgrims Hatch

Shenfield

Tipps Cross

Warley

References

2016 English local elections
2016
2010s in Essex